Robert Otto Pohl (born December 17, 1929, in Göttingen) is a German-American physicist, specializing in condensed matter physics topics such as solid state physics, thermal conductivity, and thin films, who is the Goldwin Smith Emeritus Professor of Physics at Cornell University where he has been on the faculty since the 1950s.

Education and career
Robert O. Pohl's father was the physicist Robert Wichard Pohl (1884–1976), whose maternal grandfather was Friedrich Wichard Lange (1826–1884), a member of the Hamburg Parliament. After completing undergraduate study at the University of Freiburg, Robert O. Pohl matriculated as a graduate student at the University of Erlangen. There he graduated with a Diplom (M.S.) in 1955 and a doctorate in 1957 and worked as an assistant in physics for the academic year 1957–1958. He emigrated to the United States in 1958. 

At Cornell University he was a research associate from 1958 to 1960), an assistant Professor from 1960 to 1963, an associate professor from 1963 to 1968), a full professor from 1968 to 2000, and Goldwin Smith Emeritus Professor of Physics from 2000 to the present. He has held visiting appointments at RWTH Aachen University (1964), the University of Stuttgart (1966–1967), the Ludwig Maximilian University of Munich, the University of Konstanz, the University of Regensburg, New Zealand's University of Canterbury, China's Tongji University, and the Nuclear Research Center in Jülich.

Robert O. Pohl has done research on experimental investigations of glass and glassy materials, as well as heat transport and lattice transport behavior in crystalline solids and in amorphous solids, structure of glass, cryogenic techniques, and energy problems.

In 1985 he received the Oliver E. Buckley Condensed Matter Prize for "his pioneering work on low energy excitations in amorphous materials and continued important contributions to the understanding of thermal transport in solids."  It was considered the highest recognition in condensed matter physics.

Pohl was elected in 1972 a fellow of the American Physical Society, in 1984 a fellow of American Association for the Advancement of Science and in 1999 a member of the National Academy of Sciences. For the academic year 1973–1974 he was a Guggenheim Fellow. In 1980 he received the Humboldt US Senior Scientist Award.

His doctoral students include Venkatesh Narayanamurti.

Springer published Robert Wichard Pohl's 3-volume edition of Einführung in die Physik (vol. 1, Mechanik und Akustik, 1930; vol. 2, Elektrizitätslehre, 1927; vol. 3, 1940, Optik) with many later editions and a 2-volume edition edited by Klaus Lüders and Robert O. Pohl (vol. 1, Mechanik, Akustik und Wärmelehre, 19th edition, 2004; vol. 2, 22nd edition, 2006). Robert O. Pohl added videos of demonstration experiments for the latest editions.

Pohl's opinions on nuclear waste disposal
In addition to his main research interests, Robert O. Pohl was concerned about radioactive waste disposal and its effects on the environment and human health. During the Carter administration he served on a Presidential advisory committee on nuclear waste disposal.

In a 1982 article published in Physics Today, Pohl wrote:

See also
 Nuclear Waste Policy Act
 Ocean disposal of radioactive waste

Selected publications

Articles
 
  (over 500 citations)
 
  (over 2200 citations)
  (over 1050 citations) See aluminium nitride.
  (over 400 citations)
 
 
  (over 450 citations)
 
  (over 3050 citations)
 
 
 
  (over 2000 citations)
 
 
 
 
  (over 400 citations)

Books
  translated from Pohls Einführung in die Physik, Band. 1 : Mechanik, Akustik und Wärmelehre by William D. Brewers (Vol. 1 contains 77 videos of experiments.)
  translated from Pohls Einführung in die Physik, Band.2 : Elektizitaetslehre und Optik by William D. Brewer (Vol. 2 contains 41 videos of experiments.)

References

External links
  (movie from the early 1970s)
 
  (creators: Klaus Lüders, Robert Otto Pohl, et al.)
  (creators: Klaus Lüders, Robert Otto Pohl, et al.)

1929 births
Living people
20th-century German physicists
21st-century German physicists
20th-century American physicists
21st-century American physicists
Condensed matter physicists
University of Freiburg alumni
University of Erlangen-Nuremberg alumni
Cornell University faculty
Fellows of the American Physical Society
Fellows of the American Association for the Advancement of Science
Members of the United States National Academy of Sciences
Oliver E. Buckley Condensed Matter Prize winners